The Penitent Magdalene is a 1565 oil painting by Titian of saint Mary Magdalene, now in the Hermitage Museum in Saint Petersburg. Unlike his 1531 version of the same subject, Titian has covered Mary's nudity and introduced a vase, an open book and a skull as a memento mori. Its colouring is more mature than the earlier work, using colours harmonising with character. In the background the sky is bathed in the rays of the setting sun, with a dark rock contrasting with the brightly lit figure of Mary.

Sources
  Wielkie muzea. Palazzo Pitti, wyd. HPS, Warszawa 2007, 
  J. Szapiro Ermitraż (translated Maria Dolińska), Wydawnictwo Progress, Moskwa, 1976

1565 paintings
Religious paintings by Titian
Paintings in the collection of the Hermitage Museum
Paintings depicting Mary Magdalene
Books in art